The 33rd Punjabis was an infantry regiment of the British Indian Army. It was raised in 1857, as the Allahabad Levy. It was designated as the 33rd Punjabis in 1903 and became 3rd Battalion 16th Punjab Regiment in 1922. In 1947, it was allocated to the Pakistan Army, where it continues to exist as 15th Battalion The Punjab Regiment.

Early history
The regiment was raised during the upheaval of the Indian Mutiny, by Lieutenant EH Longmore at Allahabad on 23 December 1857, as the Allahabad Levy. The regiment took part in the Third Anglo-Burmese War of 1885–87.

33rd Punjabis
Subsequent to the reforms brought about in the Indian Army by Lord Kitchener in 1903, the regiment's designation was changed to 33rd Punjabis. During the First World War, the 33rd Punjabis served in Egypt, France, Aden and German East Africa. In 1917, the regiment raised a second battalion, which was disbanded after the war. In 1919, the 33rd Punjabis participated in the Third Afghan War.

Subsequent history
In 1921–22, a major reorganization was undertaken in the British Indian Army leading to the formation of infantry groups of four to six battalions. Among these was the 16th Punjab Regiment, formed by grouping the 33rd Punjabis  with the 30th, 31st and 46th Punjabis, and the 9th Bhopal Infantry. The battalion's new designation was 3rd Battalion 16th Punjab Regiment. During the Second World War, the battalion fought in the Malayan Campaign and was taken prisoner by the Japanese on Singapore Island following the British surrender on 15 February 1942. It was re-raised in 1946. In 1947, the 16th Punjab Regiment was allocated to Pakistan Army. In 1956, it was merged with the 1st, 14th and 15th Punjab Regiments to form one large Punjab Regiment, and 3/16th Punjab was redesignated as 15 Punjab. In 1948, the battalion fought in the war with India in Kashmir, while during the 1965 Indo-Pakistan War, it fought at the Rann of Kutch and Chhamb-Jaurian. In 1971, it served in Lahore Sector.

Genealogy
1857 Allahabad Levy
1861 37th Regiment of Bengal Native Infantry
1861 33rd Regiment of Bengal Native Infantry
1864 33rd (Allahabad) Regiment of Bengal Native Infantry
1885 33rd Regiment of Bengal Infantry
1891 33rd (Punjab) Regiment of Bengal Infantry
1901 33rd Punjab Infantry
1903 33rd Punjabis
1917 1st Battalion 33rd Punjabis
1922 3rd Battalion 16th Punjab Regiment
1956 15th Battalion The Punjab Regiment

References

Further reading
Lawford, Lt Col JP, and Catto, Maj WE. (1967). Solah Punjab: The History of the 16th Punjab Regiment. Aldershot: Gale & Polden.
Rizvi, Brig SHA. (1984). Veteran Campaigners – A History of the Punjab Regiment 1759–1981. Lahore: Wajidalis.
Cardew, Lt FG. (1903). A Sketch of the Services of the Bengal Native Army to the Year 1895. Calcutta: Military Department.

See also
16th Punjab Regiment
Punjab Regiment

Punjab Regiment (Pakistan)
British Indian Army infantry regiments
Indian World War I regiments
Military units and formations established in 1857
1857 establishments in India